The 1951 VMI Keydets football team was an American football team that represented the Virginia Military Institute (VMI) during the 1951 college football season as a member of the Southern Conference. In their third year under head coach Tom Nugent, the team compiled an overall record of 7–3 and finished as Southern Conference co-champion.

Schedule

References

VMI
VMI Keydets football seasons
Southern Conference football champion seasons
VMI Keydets football